City on Fire is a 2015 novel by Garth Risk Hallberg, published by Alfred A. Knopf. The novel takes place in New York City in the 1970s. It is Hallberg's first published novel. Hallberg received an advance of $2 million for the novel, likely the most ever for a debut novel.

Summary
City on Fire follows the investigation of a Central Park shooting that took place on New Year's Eve during the 1970s.

This book was a New York Times Notable Book and named one of the Best Books of the Year by The Washington Post, Los Angeles Times, NPR, Vogue, San Francisco Chronicle, and The Wall Street Journal.

Television series 

A television adaptation of the novel will air on Apple TV+.

Reception
City on Fire received a mixed reception from critics. The novel received praise from Megan O'Grady in Vogue, who called it "the kind of exuberant, Zeitgeisty New York novel, like The Bonfire of the Vanities or The Goldfinch, that you'll either love, hate, or pretend to have read". Michiko Kakutani of The New York Times described it as "an amazing virtual reality machine", and credited Hallberg with an "instinctive gift for spinning suspense not just out of dovetailing plotlines and odd Dickensian coincidences but also from secrets buried in his characters' pasts".

On the other hand, Elisabeth Vincentelli of the New York Post called it "overhyped" and, more incendiously, "a steaming pile of literary dung". Vincentelli points out that, more than a month after publication, the market had not taken to the book despite praise from other publications:

The book-buying public isn't so easily swindled: City on Fire lingers at No. 825 on the Amazon sales charts. It can't even make it up the literary-fiction list, where it's marooned at No. 134.

At The Guardian, Sandra Newman echoed the sentiment of overhype, calling it "a debut of remarkable promise, rather than as the masterpiece that fulfills that promise".

References

2015 American novels
Alfred A. Knopf books
Novels set in New York City
Novels set in the 1970s
Jonathan Cape books
2015 debut novels
American historical novels
American novels adapted into television shows